The Harbours, Docks and Piers Clauses Act 1847 is an Act of Parliament of the United Kingdom which governs harbours, docks and piers.

Port police
The act allows two justices of the peace to swear in port police officers as "special constables" with jurisdiction within the limits of the harbour, dock, pier and premises of the port company, and within one mile of the same. Two justices may also dismiss such a constable. The act uses the term 'special constable'; at the time this act was passed 'special constable' meant any constable who was not a member of a territorial police force.

Officers of approved port police forces were issued with the faithful service medal after the qualifying period of service.

See also
List of port police forces of the United Kingdom

References

External links

United Kingdom Acts of Parliament 1847